Cook Township may refer to:

 Cook Township, Sac County, Iowa
 Cook Township, Decatur County, Kansas
 Cook Township, Westmoreland County, Pennsylvania

See also  
 Cook (disambiguation)